Petros Mavimbela (born 1963) is a politician from Eswatini who is serving as Speaker of the House of Assembly from October 2018 and Eswatini Branch President of Commonwealth Parliamentary Association.

References 

Speakers of the House of Assembly of Eswatini
Members of the Parliament of Eswatini
Living people
1963 births